San Gaban District is one of ten districts of the province Carabaya in Peru.

See also 
 Inambari River
 Qillwaqucha Urqu

References